Sophia La Porta is a British actress known for her roles in Censor (2021), Been So Long (2018) and the miniseries Four Weddings and a Funeral (2019). She began acting professionally in the early 2010s, first appearing on TV in the medical drama Holby City (2010) followed by supernatural miniseries The Fades (2011). Her first feature film appearances were in 2018, with supporting roles in well-received musical Been So Long and drama Into the Mirror.

Filmography

Film

Television

References

Year of birth missing (living people)
Living people
British television actresses
British film actresses
21st-century British actresses